Garrett Alan Whitley (born March 13, 1997) is an American professional baseball outfielder in the Philadelphia Phillies organization. He was drafted by the Tampa Bay Rays as the 13th pick in the first round of the 2015 Major League Baseball draft.

Amateur career
Whitley attended Niskayuna High School in Niskayuna, New York. As a junior, he batted .474 with two home runs and 25 runs batted in (RBI). As a senior, he hit .356 with three home runs and 13 RBI.

Whitley was considered one of the top prospects for the 2015 MLB draft. He was drafted by the Tampa Bay Rays in the first round, 13th overall, of the draft. He committed to Wake Forest University to play college baseball but signed with the Rays.

Professional career

Tampa Bay Rays
Whitley made his professional debut with the Gulf Coast Rays and was promoted to the Hudson Valley Renegades to end the season. He posted a combined .174 batting average with three home runs and 17 RBIs in 42 games between both teams. He returned to Hudson Valley in 2016, where he improved, batting .266 with one home run and 31 RBIs along with 21 stolen bases in 65 games. In 2017, he played for the Bowling Green Hot Rods where he posted a .249 batting average with 13 home runs, 61 RBIs, and 21 stolen bases over 104 games.

Whitley played with the Perth Heat for the 2017-18 Australian Baseball League season. He missed all of the 2018 season due to injury, but returned to play in 2019 with the Charlotte Stone Crabs, slashing .226/.339/.412 with ten home runs and forty RBIs over 114 games. He did not play a minor league game in 2020 due to the cancellation of the minor league season caused by the COVID-19 pandemic. Whitley split the 2021 season between the Montgomery Biscuits and Durham Bulls, slashing .229/.338/.444 with 13 home runs, 35 RBIs, and 12 stolen bases over 88 games. He elected free agency after the season's end.

Milwaukee Brewers
On December 9, 2021, Whitley signed a minor league contract with the Milwaukee Brewers. He elected free agency on November 10, 2022.

Philadelphia Phillies
On December 24, 2022, Whitley signed a minor league contract with the Philadelphia Phillies.

References

External links

1997 births
Living people
People from Niskayuna, New York
Baseball players from New York (state)
Baseball outfielders
Gulf Coast Rays players
Hudson Valley Renegades players
Bowling Green Hot Rods players
Charlotte Stone Crabs players
Perth Heat players
American expatriate baseball players in Australia
Nashville Sounds players
Montgomery Biscuits players
Durham Bulls players
African-American baseball players
Biloxi Shuckers players